The Westfield Megabusa is a British-made Lotus Seven inspired car with a 1,299 cc motorcycle engine, taken from the Suzuki Hayabusa, and six-speed sequential gearbox. The Megabusa is a road legal track car in at least some European countries.

Extras available
Front anti-roll bar
Oval wide track front wishbones with cantilever inboard anti-roll bar
Rear anti-roll bar
Detachable rear arches
Rear FW body styling
Quick release steering wheel
Trimmed racing seats
RAC specification roll bar
Full FIA roll cage
Uprated suspension made by Nitron Racing Shocks
Four point 3" race harnesses
Limited slip differential
Full electrically heated screen
Weather tonneau cover
Full trim interior
Epoxy coated aluminium panels

References

External links

 Westfield Sportscars Ltd.

Lotus Seven replicas
Megabusa